Forest Vance (born 16 April 1981, in Bellingham, WA) is a former American football player and personal trainer. He played for the Green Bay Packers and the Kansas City Chiefs of the National Football League and played college football for the University of California, Davis.

Early years
Vance graduated from Colfax High School in 1999 where he lettered in football and track.

College career
Vance started in 48 straight games for Cal- Davis, earning letters each season (2000-2003).  He moved to the guard position as a senior after playing tackle his first three seasons and was selected to the Division I – AA Independent All-Star team in 2003. Vance was an all-region honoree as a junior, in addition to receiving Associated Press Little all-America third-team honors.  While on the Aggie roster, Vance played tight end, offensive tackle, outside linebacker, and defensive end. He graduated from UC Davis with a degree in communications.

Professional career

NFL career
Vance earned a spot on the opening day training camp rosters of the Green Bay Packers (2004)  and Kansas City Chiefs (2005 ).
Vance signed with Green Bay as an undrafted free agent on April 30, 2004 as an offensive guard. He was one of the Packers final cuts but was placed on injured reserve after he tore the cartilage in his right knee. Vance was picked up by the Chiefs in August 2004 but was released in 2005 due to injury.

Physical Therapy and Personal Training

After his football career, Vance earned a Master of Science in Human Movement from A.T. Still University in Mesa, Arizona, as well as his Personal Trainer certifications through the National Academy of Sports Medicine and American College of Sports Medicine. He also is a Certified Corrective Exercise Specialist and Performance Enhancement Specialist through the National Academy of Sports Medicine. He has been featured on KCRA-TV as an expert in Kettlebell Training  and self-published a book in 2009 entitled "No Gym? No Excuse!".

References 

1981 births
Living people
Players of American football from Washington (state)
Sportspeople from Bellingham, Washington
University of California, Davis alumni